Gustavo González (born 15 September 1964) is a Peruvian footballer. He played in one match for the Peru national football team in 1989. He was also part of Peru's squad for the 1991 Copa América tournament.

References

External links
 

1964 births
Living people
Peruvian footballers
Peru international footballers
Association football goalkeepers
People from Iquitos